In Greek mythology, Eurynomos (Greek Εὐρύνομος; Latin Eurynomus) was the netherworld daimon (spirit) of rotting corpses dwelling in the Underworld. Eurynomos is either a minor figure whose associated literature is lost to time, or possibly an invention by the painter Polygnotos. He is also mentioned by Anton LaVey in The Satanic Bible as one of the Infernal Names and described as the "Greek prince of death", although the author does not identify which source was used to back up his claim. The sole piece of evidence concerning him is the following paragraph by Pausanias in a painting of Hades by Polygnotos at Delphoi, Phocis:

In popular culture
In the last book of The Cronus Chronicles, The Immortal Flame, Eurynomus is mentioned. He was stated as wearing vulture feathers as a cloak, with blue-black skin the colour of flies. He also had the ability to turn invisible and intangible, the perfect spy. He was "hired" by the antagonist Philonecron to spy on the protagonist, and Philonecron stated that he had hygiene issues.
In the Japanese animated series Yondemasuyo, Azazel-san, Eurynomos appears as a blue-black pig demon who spreads despair by inflicting his victims with severe hemorrhoids.
This character is found in Umberto Eco's Foucault's Pendulum (chapter 41) with the spelling 'Eurynomius' as an example of a "principal of evil."
The Swiss extreme metal band Hellhammer have a track entitled "Eurynomos", which appears on their 1983 demo tape Satanic Rites.
Euronymous was used as the stage name for the Norwegian black metal musician Øystein Aarseth of the band Mayhem.
Eurynomos appears in the fourth book of The Trials of Apollo, The Tyrant's Tomb, by Rick Riordan as a species of ghouls who eat the flesh off of corpses, raising up the picked-clean bodies as elite skeleton warriors. Their claws also carry a disease that, should a scratch victim die from it, will rise up as a zombie, also dubbed a vrykolakas.

Notes

Reference 

 Pausanias, Description of Greece with an English Translation by W.H.S. Jones, Litt.D., and H.A. Ormerod, M.A., in 4 Volumes. Cambridge, MA, Harvard University Press; London, William Heinemann Ltd. 1918. . Online version at the Perseus Digital Library
 Pausanias, Graeciae Descriptio. 3 vols. Leipzig, Teubner. 1903.  Greek text available at the Perseus Digital Library.

Further reading
 Anton LaVey, The Satanic Bible
 Miriam Van Scott, The Encyclopedia of Hell

Greek underworld
Greek legendary creatures
Daimons